Iceland took control of its foreign affairs in 1918 when it became a sovereign country, the Kingdom of Iceland, in a personal union with the King of Denmark. As a fully independent state, Iceland could have joined the League of Nations in 1918, but chose not to do so for cost reasons. It negotiated with Denmark to initially carry out most of its foreign relations, while maintaining full control. Denmark appointed a diplomatic envoy (Ambassador) to Iceland in 1919 and Iceland reciprocated in 1920, opening an Embassy in Copenhagen. Iceland established its own Foreign Service in April 1940 when Denmark became occupied by Nazi Germany and ties between the two countries were severed. The Republic of Iceland was founded in 1944. The Icelandic foreign service grew slowly in the post-WWII period, but increased rapidly after the mid-1990s. Iceland's closest relations are with the Nordic states, the European Union and the United States. Iceland has been a member of the United Nations since 1946. Iceland was a founding member of the World Bank in 1946 and NATO in 1949. In terms of European integration, Iceland was a founding member of the OEEC (now OECD) in 1948 and the Nordic Council in 1952, it joined EFTA in 1970, was a founding member of the CSCE (now OSCE) in 1973 and the EEA in 1992 and joined Schengen in 1996.

From 1951 to 2006, there was an American military base and troop presence in Iceland. During the Cold War, Iceland had a close but contentious relationship with the United States, leading some scholars to describe Iceland as a "rebellious ally" and "reluctant ally." Iceland repeatedly threatened to leave NATO or cancel the US defence agreement during the Cold War. As a consequence, the United States provided Iceland with extensive economic assistance and diplomatic support. Iceland hosted the historic 1986 Reagan-Gorbachev summit in Reykjavík, which set the stage for the end of the Cold War.

Fishing rights 

Iceland's principal historical international disputes involved disagreements over fishing rights. Conflict with the United Kingdom led to the so-called Cod Wars in 1952–56 because of the extension of the fishing zone from 3 to 4 nautical miles (6 to 7 km), 1958–61 because of extending the fishing zone to 12 nautical miles (22 km) in 1972–73 because of its further extension to 50 nautical miles (93 km) and in 1975–76 because of its extension to 200 nautical miles (370 km). Disagreements with Norway and Russia over fishing rights in the Barents Sea were successfully resolved in 2000.

Whaling 

Certain environmentalists are concerned that Iceland left the International Whaling Commission (IWC) in June 1992 in protest of an IWC decision to refuse to lift the ban on whaling, after the IWC Scientific Committee had determined that the taking of certain species could safely be resumed. That year, Iceland established a separate commission – along with Norway, Greenland and the Faroe Islands – for the conservation, management, and study of marine mammals. Since then, Iceland has resumed whaling for scientific purpose and has rejoined the IWC (in October 2002). The Icelandic Fisheries Ministry issued a permit to hunt 39 whales for commercial purposes on 17 October 2006. 25 states delivered a formal diplomatic protest to the Icelandic government on 1 November concerning resumed commercial whaling. The protest was led by the United Kingdom and supported by others such as Finland and Sweden.

Recognition of post-Soviet states 

Iceland was the first country to recognize the regained independence of Lithuania, Latvia, Estonia, Georgia, Armenia and Azerbaijan from the USSR in 1990–1991. Similarly, it was the first country to recognize Montenegro's independence from its former union with Serbia. Iceland was also the first country to recognize Croatia, having done so on 19 December 1991. Significantly, Iceland was also the first Western state to recognise Palestine when it did so in 2011. Iceland also is the greatest Nordic contributor per capita to NATO-led troops in Bosnia and Kosovo, to the police in Bosnia and to Bosnian/Kosovan reconstruction, resettlement and relief efforts.

Membership in international organizations
Iceland is a member of the following organisations: North Atlantic Treaty Organization; Organization for Security and Co-operation in Europe; International Criminal Court; International Bank for Reconstruction and Development; International Development Association; International Finance Corporation; Organisation for Economic Co-operation and Development; European Economic Area; European Free Trade Association; Council of Europe; International Criminal Police Organization; and the United Nations, since 19 November 1946, and most of its specialized agencies, including the International Monetary Fund, World Trade Organization, Food and Agriculture Organization, International Atomic Energy Agency, International Civil Aviation Organization, International Labour Organization, International Maritime Organization, International Telecommunication Union, United Nations Educational, Scientific, and Cultural Organization, Universal Postal Union, World Health Organization, World Meteorological Organization and the International Whaling Commission.

Iceland was given the opportunity to join the League of Nations after becoming sovereign in 1918, but opted not to, primarily due to limited administrative resources. Iceland joined the UN in 1945 but took until 1965 to establish a permanent mission.

In the IMF, Iceland is in the Nordic-Baltic constituency of the 24-member executive board of the IMF, along with Denmark, Finland, Norway, Sweden, Latvia, Lithuania and Estonia.

International disputes

Rockall

Iceland has an ongoing dispute with Denmark (on behalf of the Faroe Islands) on the one hand and with the UK and Ireland on the other hand, concerning claims to the continental shelf in the Hatton–Rockall area of the North Atlantic under the UN Convention on the Law of the Sea (1982). Iceland's claim covers virtually the entire area claimed by the other three countries, except for a small portion in the south-east corner of the Irish claim, while the Faroes claim most of the area claimed by the UK and Ireland. Negotiations continue between the four countries in the hope of making a joint proposal to the United Nations Commission on the Limits of the Continental Shelf by May 2009.

Deposit insurance

Following the collapse of Icesave sparking the 2008–2011 Icelandic financial crisis, the U.K. and the Netherlands offered to insure the deposits of the bank's customers. They then sought repayment from Iceland, which held a referendum on the issue in 2010 and 2011, both of which failed. The two governments then said they would take the issue to European courts to seek redress they alleged is owed to them. In January 2013 the EFTA court cleared Iceland of all charges.

European Union application 

Iceland has had a close relationship with the European Union (EU) throughout its development, but has remained outside (instead, joining the European Free Trade Area or EFTA). In 1972, the two sides signed a free trade agreement and in 1994 Iceland joined the European Economic Area which let itself and other non-EU states have access to the EU's internal market in exchange for Iceland contributing funds and applying EU law in relevant areas. The EU is Iceland's most important trading partner with a strong trade surplus in 2008/9 in terms of goods, services and foreign direct investment. Iceland also participates in the Schengen Area (as well as relevant police and judicial cooperation) and has non-voting representation in some EU agencies.

However, after Iceland's financial crash in 2008, it has sought membership of the EU and the euro. Iceland applied on 16 July 2009 and negotiations formally began 17 June 2011. After an agreement is concluded, the accession treaty must be ratified by every EU state and be subject to a national referendum in Iceland. Since the application was submitted, popular support has declined and contentious issues around Icelandic fisheries may derail negotiations. However the Icelandic government is confident an agreement can be reached based on the flexibility shown by the EU in its previous negotiations with Norway.

In 2014, Iceland froze their application to join the European Union.

Agreed Minute 

The Agreed Minute was a statute governing the nature of the U.S. military presence in Iceland. The Agreed Minute was last renegotiated in 2001. At the time, the U.S. Air Force committed itself to maintaining four to six interceptors at the Keflavík base, supported by a helicopter rescue squad. The Air Force, in order to cut costs, announced plans to remove the four remaining jets in 2003. The removal was then delayed to address Icelandic demands for continued presence of the jets. After an unfruitful series of negotiations and two reshuffles of the Icelandic government the issue lay dormant until early 2006 when the U.S. Air Force issued an official statement that withdrawal of the aircraft was already being prepared. U.S. officials have since then argued that Iceland is in no need of a military presence.

NATO allies since then conduct air policing after the U.S. Air Force withdrawal.

Diplomatic relations 

List of countries which Iceland has diplomatic relations with:

Bilateral Relations 
Iceland's first embassy was established in Copenhagen in 1920. The second and third embassies were opened in London and Sweden in 1940. That same year, a consulate-general was installed in New York (a year later, an embassy was opened in Washington D.C.). The Icelandic foreign service grew slowly (both in terms of missions and staff) in the post-WWII period, but increased rapidly after the mid-1990s. The Icelandic foreign service is vastly smaller than those of its Nordic neighbors.

Africa

Americas

Asia

Europe

Oceania

See also
 List of diplomatic missions in Iceland
 List of diplomatic missions of Iceland
 Ministry for Foreign Affairs (Iceland)
 Iceland - Establishment of Diplomatic Relations

References

Further reading

 Baldur Thorhallson (ed.). 2018. Small States and Shelter Theory: Iceland’s External Affairs. Routledge.
 Baldur Thorhallsson (ed.). 2004. Iceland and European Integration: On the Edge. Routledge.
 Pétur J. Thorsteinsson. 1992. Utanríkisþjónusta Íslands og utanríkismál: Sögulegt Yfirlit. Rekjavík: Hið íslenska bókmenntafélag.
 Valur Ingimundarson. 2011. The Rebellious Ally: Iceland, the United States, and the Politics of Empire 1945–2006. Dordrecht Publishing.
 Valur Ingimundarson. 2002. Uppgjör við umheiminn. Reykjavík: Vaka-Helgafell.
 Valur Ingimundarson. 1996. Í eldlínu kalda stríðsins. Reykjavík: Vaka-Helgafell.

External links
Icelandic Foreign Service Iceland's embassies and missions abroad
(in Icelandic) Historical overview by Iceland's Ministry of Foreign Affairs
Iceland's Ministry of  Foreign Affairs
  European Commission > The EU's relations with Iceland
  The Icelandic European Movement (favours Icelandic EU membership)
  Heimssýn, the cross-political organisation of Icelandic eurosceptics
Foreign representations in Iceland
Canadian Embassy in Iceland
United States Embassy in Reykjavík